Kestner Gesellschaft (Kestner Society) is an art institution in Hanover, Germany, founded in 1916 to promote the arts. Its founders included the painter Wilhelm von Debschitz (1871–1948).

In 1997 the Kestner Gesellschaft moved into new premises at Goseriede 11, the former site of the Goseriede Aquatic Center. The new gallery is next to the Hannoversche Allgemeine Zeitung, Hanover's newspaper.

The institution hit the headlines in 2005 when it exhibited a mud house created by Spanish artist Santiago Sierra featuring a room with mud floor reminiscent of Hanover's Maschsee, an artificial lake.

From 2015 to 2019, institution’s first female director was Christina Végh.

The current director is Adam Budak, who took on the position in November 2020.

History 
In 1916, with World War I raging, the Kestner Gesellschaft was founded by citizens of Hanover, among them Hermann Bahlsen, August Madsack and Fritz Beindorff. Their goal was to bring internationally renowned and innovative artists and their current works to Hanover. The first exhibition representing the starting point for this concept in 1916 consisted of Max Liebermann's new work. The first director, Paul Küppers, stated at the time that the aim was to present artworks which "do not simply function as a relaxing amusement but instead have a stimulating and – if necessary – provocative and scandalizing effect".

In 1936, the Kestner Gesellschaft was closed under pressure from Hitler's Nazism. The director at the time, Justus Bier, a Jew, presented artists Erich Heckel, Gerhard Marcks, Christian Rohlfs and August Macke – artists who were featured in the notorious Degenerate Art exhibition in Munich only one year later. Soon after the war, the new Kestner Gesellschaft was opened in the Warmbüchenstraße in 1948 by Hanoverians with service to the public in mind, among them Hermann Bahlsen, Wilhelm Stichweh, Bernhard Sprengel and Günther Beindorff, the director of the company Pelikan.

In the 1990s, this building could no longer meet the high technical demands of modern exhibition operations, and the Kestner Gesellschaft looked for a new location. The former Goseriede Aquatic Center in the centre was chosen, and a team of internationally selected architects designed and oversaw the transformation into a modern exhibition house.

The list of artists whose works have been exhibited during the 75-year history – excluding the years of closure – reads like a "Who's Who" in the history of 20th- and 21st-century art, among them Paul Klee (1920), Wassily Kandinsky (1923), El Lissitzky (1923) and Kurt Schwitters (1924), both friends of the Kestner Gesellschaft, Joan Miró (1952, 1956, 1989), Jean Dubuffet (1960), Marcel Duchamp and Horst Janssen (1965), Pablo Picasso (1973, 1993), Wolf Vostell (1977), Andy Warhol (1981 as his first retrospective in Germany, 2001) Jean-Michel Basquiat (1986 as the youngest at age 25, 1989), Georg Baselitz (1987), Joseph Beuys (1975, 1990), Richard Prince (1991), Rebecca Horn (1978, 1991, 1997), Antoni Tàpies (1962, 1998), Jonathan Meese (2002), Thomas Ruff (2003), Peter Doig (2004), Rochelle Feinstein, (2016/17),  James Richards, (2016/17)  and Annette Kelm (2017).

In 2017, the third edition of the collection , which is collectively curated on a five-year-cycle by the three institutions Kestner Gesellschaft, Kunstverein Hannover and Sprengel Museum Hannover, took place. Under the heading "Produktion. Made in Germany Three", the exhibition focused on the conditions of producing art in Germany. As participating institutions, the Schauspiel Hannover , the Festival Theaterformen, and the KunstFestSpiele are contributing the first time.

Kestner Gesellschaft at the Goseriede

The House 

In 1997, the Prime Minister of Lower Saxony, Gerhard Schröder, inaugurated the new facilities of the Kestner Gesellschaft at Goseriede 11. Simultaneously, the Munich Abendzeitung declared the remodelled exhibition facility "Germany’s most beautiful exhibition house." The remodelling of the former Goseriede Aquatic Center into an up-to-date exhibition house not only incorporates the high technical demands of modern exhibition operations but also preserves and showcases the Jugendstil features of this historic landmark. With its five halls on two levels, the house has at its command more than 1,500 square meters of exhibition surface.

History of the House 
From 1902 to 1905 the Hanoverian chief city architectural commissioner, Carl Wolff, oversaw the construction of the Goseriede Aquatic Center. The middle section of the public bathing facility was destroyed in 1943 during the Second World War, and later rebuilt from 1947 to 1953. After the reopening, the pool remained in use until 1982. In the same year, the city placed the beautiful Jugendstil façade under protection as a monument. In 1990 the Madsack publishing company purchased the building, offering the sections of the former women's pool area, entrance hall and all adjoining rooms to the Kestner Gesellschaft for its use. An international architectural competition was launched in 1992 in search of an innovative design for the space with the support of the Norddeutsche Landesbank. Chaired by Prof. Peter P. Schweger, the jury awarded the first prize to the Hanoverian architects Kai-Michael Koch, Anne Panse and Christian Hühn. In collaboration with the curators of the Kestner Gesellschaft, their design was developed further into an elegant and dynamic amalgamation of modern architectural elements. The prize of the Association of German Architects of the State of Lower Saxony was awarded to the building in 1998.

Exhibition spaces 
Each of the five halls at Kestner Gesellschaft has its own unique dimensions and atmosphere. Able to accommodate diverse exhibition concepts, the spaces can be transformed with high-tech equipment including a close-meshed and invisible network of electrical connections in the floors, walls and ceilings. The lateral galleries in the Halls II and III can be closed off to create smaller exhibition spaces. The total of twelve entrances into the Claussen Hall may be used to create different orientations of projects and viewers. In planning for the building renovations, care was also taken to create the necessary infrastructure for the careful transport and handling of artworks to and within the halls, with direct access to the exhibition spaces via loading dock. Due to ceiling-high gates on the ground- and upper-floors along with a large elevator, pieces arrive safely and easily into the exhibition halls.

Kestnereditions 
Since 2003, Kestnereditions are being released related to every exhibition. The works, which include graphic art, photography and other art forms, are offered exclusively for members of the Kestner Gesellschaft in limited editions.

Exhibitions until 1936

Exhibitions from 1948 until 1995 

 Emil Nolde 1948
 Pablo Picasso 1949, 1965, 1979, 1994
 Max Beckmann 1949
 Werner Gilles 1949
 Gerhard Marcks 1949
 Fernand Léger 1949
 Fritz Winter 1951
 Walter Gropius 1951
 Marino Marini 1952
 Werner Gilles 952
 Alexander Camaro 1952
 Joan Miró 1952, 1958, 1990
 Ewald Mataré 1952
 Hans Uhlmann 1953
 Erich Heckel 1953
 Karl Hartung 1953
 Henry Moore 1953
 Eduard Bargheer 1953
 Emy Roeder 1953
 Fritz Grasshoff 1954
 Saul Steinberg 1954
 Hans Arp 1955
 André Masson 1955
 Marc Chagall 1955, 1985
 K.R.H. Sonderborg 1956
 Hans Hartung 1957
 Gustave Singier 1957
 Theo Eble 1958
 Maria Elena Vieira da Silva 1958
 Bruno Goller 1958
 Jean-Paul Riopelle 1958
 Julius Bissier 1958
 Alfred Manessier 1959
 Ben Nicholson 1959
 Woty Werner 1959
 Hann Trier 1959
 Kenneth Armitage 1960
 William Scott 1960
 Hans Reichel 1960
 Jean Dubuffet 1960
 Pierre Soulages 1961
 Etienne Hajdu 1961
 Joseph Fassbender 1961
 Emil Schumacher 1961
 Victor Pasmore 1962
 Edwin Scharff 1962
 Jean Bazaine 1963
 Zoltan Kemeny 1963
 Sam Francis 1963
 Serge Poliakoff 1963
 Kumi Sugai 1963
 Gregory Masurovsky 1963
 Victor Vasarely 1964
 Paul Jenkins 1964
 Heinz Battke 1964
 Hundertwasser 1964
 Richard Oelze 1964
 Alfred Kubin 1964
 Paul Eliasberg 1965
 Victor Brauner 1965
 Horst Janssen 1965
 Bernard Schultze 1966
 Mark Tobey 1966
 Alberto Giacometti 1966
 Konrad Klapheck 1966
 Wifredo Lam 1966
 Joannis Avramidis 1967
 Ben Nicholson 1967
 Pierre Roy 1967
 Hans Bellmer 1967
 Rupprecht Geiger 1967
 Auguste Herbin 1967
 Fritz Wotruba 1967
 Alan Davie 1968
 Lucio Fontana 1968
 Antonio Calderara 1968
 Roy Lichtenstein 1968
 Domenico Gnoli 1968
 Josef Albers 1968
 Max Bill 1968
 Almir Mavignier 1968
 René Magritte 1969
 Miguel Berrocal 1969
 Gotthard Graubner 1969
 Graham Sutherland 1970
 R. B. Kitaj 1970
 Jim Dine 1970
 Giorgio de Chirico 1970
 Pol Bury 1972
 Jean Tinguely 1972
 Günther Uecker 1972
 Marcello Morandini 1972
 Tomi Ungerer 1973
 Joseph Cornell 1973
 Alfred Jensen 1973
 Josef Albers 1973
 Horst Janssen 1973
 Jorge Castillo 1973
 George Rickey 1973
 Michelangelo Pistoletto 1974
 Gisela Andersch 1974
 Walter Dexel 1974
 Uwe Bremer 1974
 Alfred Hrdlicka 1974
 Dieter Roth 1974
 Roberto Matta 1974
 Peter Ackermann 1974
 André Thomkins 1974
 Eduardo Paolozzi 1975
 Bernhard Luginbühl 1975
 Saul Steinberg 1975
 Joseph Beuys 1976, 1990
 Cy Twombly 1976
 Claes Oldenburg 1976
Arnulf Rainer 1977
 Wolf Vostell  1977
 Jochen Gerz 1978
 Rebecca Horn 1978, 1991
 Eva Hesse 1979
 Howard Kanovitz 1980
 Pierre Alechinsky 1980
 Larry Rivers 1981
 Raoul Hausmann 1981
 Mimmo Paladino 1981
 Andy Warhol 1981
 Egon Schiele 1982
 Mario Merz 1982
 Adolf Hölzel 1982
 Peter Blake 1983
 Markus Lüpertz 1983
 Hans Bellmer 1984
 Howard Hodgkin 1985
 Christian Ludwig Attersee 1985
 Tony Cragg 1986
 Jean-Charles Blais 1986
 Benjamin Katz 1986
 Jean-Michel Basquiat 1986
 Martin Disler 1987
 Fred Sandback 1987
 Georg Baselitz 1987
 George Grosz 1988
 Jakob Mattner 1988
 A.R. Penck 1988
 Sol LeWitt 1989
 John Baldessari 1989
 Astrid Klein 1989
 Bernhard Minetti 1989
 Jean-Michel Basquiat 1989
 Richard Hamilton 1990
 Klaus vom Bruch 1990
 Jannis Kounellis 1991
 Robert Wilson 1991
 Per Kirkeby 1992
 David Tremlett 1992
 Eugen Schönebeck 1992
 Thomas Huber 1993
 Richard Prince 1994

Exhibitions since 1997 

 Rebecca Horn 1997
 Antoni Tàpies 1998
 Andy Warhol 2001
 Jonathan Meese 2002
 Thomas Ruff 2003
 Peter Doig 2004
 Peter Fischli and David Weiss 2004
 Miquel Barceló 2004
 Cindy Sherman 2004
 Santiago Sierra 2005
 Gilbert & George 2005
 Sarah Morris 2005
 Candida Höfer 2005
 Michel Majerus 2005
 Erik Bulatov 2006
 Thomas Hirschhorn 2006
 Bazon Brock 2006
 Chris Ofili 2006
 Barbara Kruger 2006
 Franz Ackermann 2006
 Wolfgang Tillmans 2007
 Raymond Pettibon 2007
 Bruce Nauman 2007
 Eric Fischl 2007
 Bettina Rheims 2007
 Araki Meets Hokusai 2008
 Helmut Lang 2008
 Jake and Dinos Chapman 2008
 David Salle 2009
 Michaël Borremans 2009
 Phoebe Washburn 2009
 Gert and Uwe Tobias 2009
 Elke Krystufek 2009
 Aaron Curry 2010
 Bethan Huws 2010
 Alicja Kwade 2010
 Larry Sultan 2010
 Olaf Nicolai 2010
 Cecily Brown 2010
 Nathalie Djurberg 2010
 Michael Sailstorfer 2010
 Joachim Koester 2010
 Julian Göthe 2011
 David LaChapelle 2011
 André Butzer 2011
 Jos de Gruyter and Harald Thys 2011
 Daniel Richter 2011
 Alice Springs 2011
 Alex Katz 2011
 Andy Hope 1930 2012
 Monica Baer 2016
 Rochelle Feinstein 2016/17
 James Richards 2016/17
 Annette Kelm 2017
 Marc Camille Chaimowicz 2017/18

Literature 
Wieland Schmied: Wegbereiter zur modernen Kunst – 50 Jahre Kestner-Gesellschaft. Hannover 1966.
Ines Katenhusen: Kunst und Politik. Hannovers Auseinandersetzungen mit der Moderne in der Weimarer Republik. Hahn, Hannover 1998, .
Veit Görner: Kestnerchronik. Buch 1, Hannover 2006, Buch 2, Hannover 2009.

References

External links 

Kestnergesellschaft website

Buildings and structures in Hanover
Art museums and galleries in Germany
Tourist attractions in Hanover
Modern art museums in Germany
Art galleries established in 1916
1916 establishments in Germany
Art Nouveau architecture in Germany
Art Nouveau museum buildings
Buildings and structures completed in 1916